Haya Day is a holiday celebrated on February 14 in Pakistan as an alternative to Valentine's Day. It was first celebrated by Islami Jamiat Talaba Pakistan.

Celebrations 

Rallies, seminars and other events are held in all major colleges and university campuses in the capital Islamabad, Karachi, Lahore, Gujranwala, Peshawar, Multan, Faisalabad, Quetta and other cities attended by students. Haya Day supporters have been criticized for opposing the romantic sentiments of Valentine's Day, holding that many in Pakistani "glorify violence" and "ridicule love".

Awareness stalls are set up in different institutions across the country and literature is distributed against Valentine's Day. One such stall was set up in Lower Mall near Government Islamia College, Civil Lines in Lahore where the student organisation played nasheeds on the topic of modesty.

References

Annual events in Pakistan
February observances
Valentine's Day